The Sarysu (Sarysu; , Sarysu) is a river in Karaganda, Turkistan and Kyzylorda Regions of Kazakhstan.

The name sary su means yellow water in Turkic languages.

Course
It arises above Atasu and flows generally westward to Kzyl-Dzhar where it turns south-westward past Birlestik and Zhanabas, then heading ever-more southerly it ends in the Telikol, across a cluster of small intermittent lakes at the western end of the Ashchykol Depression and to the east of the Dariyaly plain. River Boktykaryn runs parallel to it just before the Sarysu bends west towards the Telikol.

See also
List of rivers of Kazakhstan

References

 Allen, W. E. D. (1956) "The Sources for G. Delisle's "Carte des Pays Voisins de la Mer Caspiene" of 1723" Imago Mundi 13: pp. 137–150, p. 139

Rivers of Kazakhstan